Lenka Bradáčová (born 1 March 1973) is a Czech lawyer and prosecutor who has been High State Attorney in Prague since 2012.

She graduated in Law and Jurisprudence at the Law Faculty of Charles University in 1998. From March 2008 to April 2014 she served as president  of the Union of Prosecutors of the Czech Republic.

Bradáčová was the most influential woman of the Czech Republic in 2014 according to the Forbes magazine´s standings.

References

1973 births
Living people
Czech prosecutors
Czech jurists
Charles University alumni
People from Roudnice nad Labem